Beihai Park is a public park and former imperial garden located in the northwestern part of the Imperial City, Beijing. First built in the 11th century, it is among the largest of all Chinese gardens and contains numerous historically important structures, palaces, and temples. Since 1925, the place has been open to the public as a park. It is also connected at its northern end to the Shichahai.

Beihai literally means "Northern Sea". There are also corresponding Central (Zhonghai) and Southern (Nanhai) "Seas" elsewhere. These latter two are joined inside a complex of buildings known after them as Zhongnanhai; it is the home of China's paramount leaders.

The Beihai Park, as with many of Chinese imperial gardens, was built to imitate renowned scenic spots and architecture from various regions of China such as Lake Tai, the elaborate pavilions and canals of Hangzhou and Yangzhou, the delicate garden structures in Suzhou and others all served as inspirations for the design of the numerous sites in this imperial garden. The structures and scenes in the Beihai Park are described as masterpieces of gardening technique that reflects the style and the superb architectural skill and richness of traditional Chinese garden art.

History

In 1179, Emperor Zhangzong of the Jin dynasty had a country resort built northeast of Zhongdu, the Jin capital, located in the southwestern part of modern Beijing. Taiye Lake was excavated along the Jinshui River and Daning Palace (大寧宮) was erected on Qionghua Island in the lake.

During the reign of Kublai Khan in the Yuan dynasty, the Qionghua island was redesigned by various architects and officials such as Liu Bingzhong, Guo Shoujing and Amir al-Din. Taiye Lake was enclosed in the Imperial City of Yuan's new capital Dadu

After the Ming dynasty moved its capital to Beijing, construction on the existing Imperial City began in 1406. At this time, the Taiye Lake were divided into three lakes by bridges, Northern Sea (Beihai, 北海), Central Sea (Zhonghai, 中海) and Southern Sea (Nanhai, 南海). The lakes were part of an extensive royal park called Xiyuan (Western Park, 西苑) in the west part of the Imperial City, Beijing.

In 1747, the Qianlong Emperor ordered that three "rare" calligraphy works housed within the Hall of Mental Cultivation made by Wang Xizhi, Wang Xianzhi, Wang Xun, as well as 134 other calligraphic works from the Imperial Collection were to be carved into stone, and displayed in the Pavilion of Reviewing the Past which was located in Beihai Park.

Notable places

The White Pagoda (Bai Ta, "White Tower") is a -high stupa placed on the highest point on Jade Flower Island, built to honor the visit of the 5th Dalai Lama in 1651. Its body is made of white stone. Sun, moon and flame engravings decorate the surface of the tower. Destroyed by the 1679 Sanhe-Pinggu earthquake, it was rebuilt the following year, and restored again in 1976 because of the Tangshan earthquake near Beijing. A reliquary, secreted inside the structure are Buddhist scriptures, monk's mantles and alms bowl, and the bones of monks (their remains after cremation).

There are several renowned Buddhist temples located within Beihai Park, such as the Yong'an Temple (Temple of Everlasting Peace) and the Chanfu Temple.

On the north bank lies the Five-Dragon Pavilions, five connected pavilions with spires and pointed upswept eaves, which was built in the Ming dynasty.

The Nine-Dragon Wall lies north of the Five-Dragon Pavilion. It was built in 1402 and is one of three walls of its kind in China. It is made of glazed bricks of seven-colors. Nine complete dragons playing in the clouds decorate both sides of the wall.

Also on the north bank is the Jingxin Room (Quieting Heart Room). Many small traditional Chinese gardens exist throughout the park.

The Round City (Tuancheng) has as its main structure the Hall of Received Light (Chengguangdian), a spacious building with a double-eaved roof made of yellow glazed tiles bordered in green. Inside there is a 1.6 m tall Buddha presented to the Guangxu Emperor of the Qing dynasty by a Khmer (Cambodian) king. It is carved from a single piece of pure white jade inlaid with precious stones. The Eight-Nation Alliance damaged the statue's left arm in the Battle of Beijing in 1900.

In Beihai Park, one could find Taihu rocks shipped from Henan province and a variety of art collections ranging from jade jars from the Yuan dynasty to a collection of 495 steles bearing inscriptions by trees of hundreds of years old.

Gallery

See also
Imperial City, Beijing
Zhongnanhai
Summer Palace
Old Summer Palace
Miaoying Temple, the site of another famous White Dagoba in Beijing
Ming tombs
Star Art Exhibition of 1979 took place here

References

External links

Official Website 
Beihai Park, Beijing
The Circular Wall (Tuancheng) - China.org.cn

Buildings and structures completed in the 11th century
Chinese architectural history
Major National Historical and Cultural Sites in Beijing
Parks in Beijing
Gardens in Beijing
Xicheng District